Serranobatrachus is a genus of frogs in the family Strabomantidae. They are endemic to the cloud forests and páramo of the Sierra Nevada de Santa Marta, Magdalena,Colombia.

Species 
The following species are recognised in the genus Serranobatrachus:

References

Amphibian genera
Amphibians of Colombia